Nicholas Allen may refer to:

 Nicholas Allen (anthropologist) (1939–2020), English anthropologist
 Nicholas Allen (theatre director) (born 1947), British theatre director
 Nick Allen (catcher) (1888–1939), American baseball catcher
 Nick Allen (infielder) (born 1998), American baseball infielder
 Nicky Allen (1958–1984), New Zealand rugby union player
 Nick Allen (politician), American politician